Aaron Leland (May 28, 1761 – August 25, 1832) was a Vermont minister and politician who served as the seventh lieutenant governor of Vermont.

Biography
Aaron Leland was born in Holliston, Massachusetts, on May 28, 1761. He was ordained as a Baptist minister in 1785 and settled in Chester, Vermont, in 1786.  Leland was a successful pastor and preacher, building up a church which gave rise to congregations in Andover and Grafton, Massachusetts and Weathersfield and Jamaica, Vermont.

Active in politics as a Democratic-Republican, Leland served in local offices including Town Clerk and Selectman, and was Windsor County Assistant Judge for eighteen years.  He also served in the Vermont House of Representatives from 1801 to 1808 and 1809 to 1811, and was Speaker from 1804 to 1808.  He was also a member of the Governor's Council and served as one of Vermont's presidential electors in 1820.

Leland served as Lieutenant Governor from 1822 to 1827.  He declined to be nominated for Governor in 1828, preferring instead to continue serving as Pastor of his church.  Though he had been a Mason, in the late 1820s Leland became active in Vermont's Antimasonic movement.  He died in Chester, Vermont, on August 25, 1832, and was buried in Chester's Brookside Cemetery.

Leland was the recipient of honorary degrees from Middlebury College and Brown University.

Sources

1761 births
1832 deaths
Lieutenant Governors of Vermont
People from Chester, Vermont
Members of the Vermont House of Representatives
Speakers of the Vermont House of Representatives
Vermont Democratic-Republicans
Vermont state court judges
19th-century Baptist ministers from the United States
Burials in Vermont
18th-century Baptist ministers from the United States